K.O.D. (initialism for King of Darkness) is the ninth studio album by American rapper Tech N9ne; it was released on October 26, 2009, by Strange Music. The album features guest appearances from Three 6 Mafia, Brotha Lynch Hung, King Gordy, Kutt Calhoun, Krizz Kaliko and Big Scoob, among others. The album is broken up into sections: "Anger", "Madness" and "The Hole," which would also be used on three EP's released after it. On October 22, 2009, the album appeared as a featured "Album Premiere" on Myspace.

The album entered at number 14 on the US Billboard 200 chart, selling 30,326 copies in its first week.

Background
Corey Taylor, from Slipknot and Stone Sour was supposed to appear on the track "Killing You", but was unable to begin recording in time and, as a result, failed to submit his vocals for the track. The label had to move forward with mastering the track for the album without his involvement.

Promotion
On September 9, 2009, Strange Music released a video on its YouTube account showing Yates regarding to his upcoming music video for "Show Me a God", stating that it would be a very serious video dedicated to his mother. The music video for "Show Me a God" was then released through Strange Music's YouTube account on October 2, 2009. On October 7, 2009, a second version of this video has also appeared on the label's account, except this one is in high definition.

On October 20, 2009, "Leave Me Alone" and "Show Me a God" was officially released as the first and second digital singles. "Strange Music Box" was also designated as a single from the album.

The music video was filmed for the single "Leave Me Alone" which it was exclusively premiered on mtvU.com on October 27, 2009, in which was the album's original release date. The music video for "Low" was released on December 3, 2009.

Track listing

References

2009 albums
Tech N9ne albums
Albums produced by Seven (record producer)
Horrorcore albums
Strange Music albums